The Fallout is a 2021 American drama film written and directed by Megan Park in her feature film directorial debut. The film stars Jenna Ortega as Vada Cavell, a high school student who navigates significant emotional trauma following a school shooting. The film also stars Maddie Ziegler, Julie Bowen, John Ortiz, Niles Fitch, Will Ropp, and Shailene Woodley in supporting roles. The score is composed by American musician and actor Finneas O'Connell.

The Fallout had its premiere at South by Southwest on March 17, 2021, and was released on January 27, 2022, on HBO Max by New Line Cinema (via Warner Bros. Pictures). It received acclaim from critics, who praised the directing, screenplay, and O'Connell's score, and lauded Ortega's performance.

Plot 
High school student Vada goes to the restroom in the middle of class after her little sister Amelia calls her when she has her first period. While she is in the bathroom, a school shooting occurs. Vada hides in a stall with her schoolmates Mia and Quinton, whose brother is killed in the shooting.

In the weeks following the incident, Vada becomes depressed and isolated from her family and best friend Nick. She cannot bring herself to enter the bathroom where she hid, resulting in her urinating herself when she hears the sound of a soda can being crushed. In order to cope with her trauma, she takes ecstasy, and Nick has to help her through the resulting high. After another night of drinking, Vada and Mia kiss and have sex.

Vada and Nick argue about her poor coping mechanisms, resulting in her venting to Quinton and then trying to kiss him, who gently rejects her as he is not emotionally ready for a relationship. She withdraws further from her family and friends, including Mia.

Later, Amelia admits to Vada that she assumed Vada resented her for the phone call that had put her in more danger. Vada assures her that that is not the case, and the two reconnect. Vada reconciles with her parents and Mia, who agrees to move forward as friends. By her next therapy session, Vada has made genuine progress in coming to terms with what happened, though she admits that she and Nick might not reconcile.

As Vada waits for Mia outside the latter's dance class, she receives a notification on her phone about another school shooting elsewhere in the country, and has a panic attack.

Cast

Production
In February 2020, it was announced Jenna Ortega had joined the cast of the film, with Megan Park directing from a screenplay she wrote. In April 2020, Maddie Ziegler joined the cast of the film. In May 2020, Will Ropp joined the cast of the film. In August 2020, Niles Fitch, Shailene Woodley, Julie Bowen and John Ortiz joined the cast of the film.

Filming was slated to begin in March 2020 but was postponed due to the COVID-19 pandemic. Principal photography began in Los Angeles in August 2020 and wrapped on September 11, 2020. In February 2021, it was announced that Finneas O'Connell would be scoring the film, marking his first film composing debut. WaterTower Music has released the soundtrack.

Release 
In December 2020, Universal Pictures acquired international distribution rights to the film. The film had its world premiere at South by Southwest on March 17, 2021. In July 2021, HBO Max acquired distribution rights to the film, with New Line Cinema distributing in territories where HBO Max is not available via parent company Warner Bros. Pictures. It was released on HBO Max on January 27, 2022.

Reception 

On Rotten Tomatoes, the film has an approval rating of 93% based on 68 reviews, with an average rating of 7.90/10. The website's critics consensus reads, "Empathetic and well-acted, The Fallout uses the aftermath of trauma to grapple with the experience of grief." On Metacritic, the film has a weighted average score of 84 out of 100 based on 12 critics, indicating "universal acclaim". Kate Erbland of IndieWire gave the film a rating of B+ and said the film tackles "real emotional stakes in the gloss of social media, unearthing something powerful in the process." Amanda Sink of The Hollywood Outsider called the film "a remarkable film that explores the ramifications of tragedy on our kids and how the human conditional response is not a one-size-fits-all."

Park's direction and Ortega's acting were both praised, and several critics cite it as Ortega's "breakout" film role. Sheri Linden of The Hollywood Reporter called the film "sensitive and piercing" and praised Park's screenplay and direction, the performances and Finneas' score, and wrote that "...Ortega's beautifully nuanced turn understands the nothing-to-look-at-here façade and the chinks in the armor." Peter Debruge of Variety called the film a "stellar debut" from Park and noted that "Ortega in particular seems to have found her voice." CinemaBlend praised the chemistry between Ortega and Ziegler, and stated that the "two girls at the center of it all also look phenomenal, as a true bond can be sensed in the process of bringing this story to life."

Audience viewership
On the week of its release, The Fallout was the number one most-watched streaming original film in the United States, as reported by TV Time.

Accolades

References

External links
 

2021 directorial debut films
2021 drama films
2021 independent films
2021 LGBT-related films
2020s English-language films
2020s high school films
American high school films
American independent films
American LGBT-related films
Film productions suspended due to the COVID-19 pandemic
Films about depression
Films about grieving
Films about post-traumatic stress disorder
Films about school violence
Films shot in Los Angeles
HBO Max films
LGBT-related drama films
New Line Cinema films
Warner Bros. films
2020s American films